The French 5th Motorized Division was a French Army division active during World War II.

World War 2

Battle Of France
During the Battle of France in May 1940 the division contained the following units:

88 Infantry Regiment
39 Infantry Regiment
129 Infantry Regiment
1 Reconnaissance Battalion
11 Artillery Regiment
211 Artillery Regiment

The division was an active division which had existed during peacetime. It was a fully motorized Infantry Division.

References 

5